
Gmina Lutocin is a rural gmina (administrative district) in Żuromin County, Masovian Voivodeship, in east-central Poland. Its seat is the village of Lutocin, which lies approximately 13 kilometres (8 mi) south-west of Żuromin and 118 km (73 mi) north-west of Warsaw.

Villages
Gmina Lutocin contains the villages and settlements of Boguszewiec, Chrapoń, Chromakowo, Dębówka, Elżbiecin, Felcyn, Głęboka, Jonne, Lutocin, Mojnowo, Nowy Przeradz, Obręb, Parlin, Pietrzyk, Przeradz Mały, Przeradz Wielki, Psota, Seroki, Siemcichy, Starcz, Swojęcin, Szczypiornia, Szoniec and Zimolza.

Neighbouring gminas
Gmina Lutocin is bordered by the gminas of Bieżuń, Lubowidz, Rościszewo, Skrwilno and Żuromin.

References
Polish official population figures 2006

Lutocin
Żuromin County